Teachers RFC is a Bermudan rugby club in Hamilton.

History
The club was founded in 1961.

Internationally Capped Players
Thomas Greenslade 
Andrew Hook
Henry Paddison
Pete Dunlop
Andre Landy
Shauntino Simons

References

External links
 Teachers Rugby Football Club at Pitch Hero

Rugby clubs established in 1961
Bermudian rugby union teams
1961 establishments in Bermuda